Qurchi Bashi (also Romanized as Qūrchī Bāshī; also known as Khurchbāshi; also known simply as Qūrchī) is a city and capital of Kamareh District of Khomeyn County, Markazi Province, Iran.  At the 2006 census, its population was 1,522, in 416 families.

References

Populated places in Khomeyn County

Cities in Markazi Province